William Ashe (17 November 1647 – 22 October 1713), of the Inner Temple and Heytesbury, Wiltshire, was an English politician.

He was born the son of Edward Ashe, of Fenchurch Street, London and was educated at the Inner Temple, (1652) and St Edmund Hall, Oxford, where he matriculated in 1664. He succeeded his father in 1656 to his estates, including the Heytesbury estate in Wiltshire,  rebuilding the house c. 1700.

He was a Member (MP) of the Parliament of England for Heytesbury on 8 October 1668, March 1679, October 1679, 1681, 1685, 1689, 1690, 1695, 1698 and January 1701 and for Wiltshire in December 1701.

He was also a Commissioner for assessment for Wiltshire from 1673 to 1680, for Kent from 1677 to 1680, and for Kent and Wiltshire from 1689 to 1690, he was a Justice of the Peace from 1689 to his death and a Deputy Lieutenant by 1701, probably to his death.

He married twice; firstly in 1670, Anne, the daughter of Alexander Popham of Littlecote, Wiltshire, with whom he had 4 sons and a daughter and secondly Mary, the daughter of John Rivett, Skinner, of London and the widow of Sir Henry Appleton, 4th Baronet of South Benfleet, Essex.

He died in 1713 and was buried at Heytesbury. He was succeeded by his son Edward.

References

1647 births
1713 deaths
Members of the pre-1707 English Parliament for constituencies in Wiltshire
Members of the Inner Temple
Alumni of St Edmund Hall, Oxford
English MPs 1661–1679
English MPs 1679
English MPs 1680–1681
English MPs 1681
English MPs 1685–1687
English MPs 1689–1690
English MPs 1690–1695
English MPs 1695–1698
English MPs 1698–1700
English MPs 1701
English MPs 1701–1702
Members of the Parliament of England (pre-1707) for Wiltshire